Gorenje Radulje (in older sources also Gorenje Radovlje) is a small settlement in the Municipality of Škocjan in southeastern Slovenia. Within the municipality, it belongs to the Local Community of Bučka. The municipality is included in the Southeast Slovenia Statistical Region and is part of the historical region of Lower Carniola.

References

External links
Gorenje Radulje at Geopedia

Populated places in the Municipality of Škocjan